A definitive stamp is a postage stamp that is part of the regular issue of a country's stamps, available for sale by the post office for an extended period of time and designed to serve the everyday postal needs of the country. The term is used in contrast to a "provisional stamp", one that is issued for a temporary period until regular stamps are available, or a "commemorative stamp", a stamp "issued to honor a person or mark a special event" available only for a limited time.  Commonly, a definitive issue or series includes stamps in a range of denominations sufficient to cover current postal rates. An "issue" generally means a set that is put on sale all at the same time, while a "series" is spread out over several years, but the terms are not precise. Additional stamps in a series may be produced as needed by changes in postal rates; nevertheless some values may be permanently available, regardless of prevailing rates; examples include 1c or 1p and $1 or £1.

Range 
 
The range of values varies by era and country, but the focus is on coverage; the values should be sufficient to make up all possible charges using as few stamps as possible.  Generally the smallest value will be the smallest unit of currency, or smallest fractional postal rate; for instance, the 1925 regular issue of the United States included a -cent stamp because some rates were expressed in fractions of a cent per ounce.  The highest value of the series is generally quite large, typically from 50 to 100 times the normal letter rate; typical values include one pound, five dollars, etc. Not often seen by the average person, they are most common for parcels.

The in-between values are usually chosen to "make change" efficiently, for instance 1, 2, 5, 10, 20, 50 in a decimal currency.  It is common to include all values between 1 and 10, multiples of 5 from 10 to 50, and multiples of 10 from 50 to 100.  Additional "oddball" values may reflect specific common rates, and if the series lasts for a period of time, there may be a number of such unusual values as in the UK QE II Machin series below.

Definitives are the workhorse stamps of a country, and as such, they tend to be small, with designs reflecting local culture and history.  The definitives of poorer countries will often be very plain and cheaply printed, unlike the large and decorative commemoratives, which are almost pure profit if bought by foreign collectors and never used for postage.

Frequency of issue
Since postal administrations know that many stamp collectors want to own every stamp of a definitive series, and a complete series can be quite expensive, there is always the temptation by governmental bureaucrats to make extra money by frequently issuing new definitive sets, as well as including stamps with very high face values in a set.  Collectors' organizations  have recommended that administrations only bring out new definitive issues no more often than every five years, and most administrations of the world follow this policy. An exception would be the death of a monarch, or other prominent leader, necessitating a new definitive series for the new ruler. Sometimes merely the portrait is changed, and the outer design (known as the frame) remains the same throughout several issues. Countries that ignore frequency of issue guidelines and issue volumes of stamps that have little to no practical usage produce what many collectors refer to as wallpaper.

Collecting 
Since definitive series are issued over a period of time and are reprinted to meet postal demand, they often contain more variation than is typically found in stamps that have a single print run. Switching printing methods and experimenting with phosphors is a common source of variation in modern stamps, while differences in watermarks and perforation are also prevalent, especially in older stamps. Many philatelists study these differences as part of their hobby and try to collect all the varieties of each stamp. Some varieties are particularly rare and can be more valuable than others of the same stamp that may look the same to the casual observer.  One notable example of this variation is the Machin stamps of the UK, where philatelists have identified over 1,000 varieties of the same basic design.

Special stamps, such as the Christmas stamps issued annually by various countries, are sometimes regarded as definitives because they are not commemoratives, but they typically only include a limited range of denominations relating specifically to the mail seen on the occasion for which they are issued.

Notable definitive stamp series 
 Argentina
 1935-1951 Patriots and Natural Resources Issue
 Australia
 Kangaroo and Map
 King George V series
 Canada
 Scroll issue
 Queen Elizabeth II issue
 Arch and maple leaf issue
 War issue
 France
Ceres series
Navigation and Commerce issue
 Germany
 Germania
 Women in German history series
 Greece
 Hermes Heads
 Norway
 , issued since 1872
 Portugal
 Ceres series
 Russia
 Gold Standard issue, produced by the USSR in 1923–1927
 United Kingdom
 Wilding series
 Machin series
 United States
 1869 Pictorial Issue
 Series of 1902
 Washington-Franklin Issues
 Presidential Issue
 Liberty issue
 Prominent Americans series
 Americana series
 Great Americans series
 Transportation coils
 Distinguished Americans series

See also 
 Canadian definitive postage stamps
 Definitive postage stamps of Ireland
 Definitive stamps of Russia
 Definitive stamps of the Soviet Union

References

Philatelic terminology